The Garden County Courthouse, located at F and Main Sts. in Oshkosh, Nebraska, is a Classical Revival style courthouse designed by John J. Huddart that was built during 1921–22.

It was built to serve Garden County, which had broken off of Deuel, and was to be located in Oshkosh, Nebraska, the designated county seat. After Oshkosh was reached by railroad in 1908, a $40,000 bond issue was voted but failed in 1914. A later bond issue passed.

It was listed on the National Register of Historic Places in 1990.

References

Courthouses on the National Register of Historic Places in Nebraska
Neoclassical architecture in Nebraska
Government buildings completed in 1921
Buildings and structures in Garden County, Nebraska
County courthouses in Nebraska
National Register of Historic Places in Garden County, Nebraska
1921 establishments in Nebraska